Walter Marcellus Lacy, also known as Marc Lacy (born May 28, 1969) is a spoken word artist. He is the author and publisher of two books of poetry: The Looking Heart – Poetic Expressions from Within and Rock & Fire – Love Poetry from the Core.

Early life
Lacy was born in Huntsville, Alabama, USA. He is the 2nd child and eldest son born to Walter and Julianne Lacy. After graduating from Alabama A&M University, Lacy worked as an engineer  for several corporations and is currently a government contractor. He spent numerous years involved in organizational work and anchoring various community service projects (member: Alpha Phi Alpha fraternity, National Society of Black Engineers) within the North Alabama area.

Career
In 2001, Lacy had co-founded The Legendary ArtNSoul Society of Expression. Via the local open mic circuit, Lacy transformed from a written poet, into a  spoken word artist. In 2004, Lacy published his first book, The Looking Heart, and co-produced his first spoken word CD, REFlux, (Charles Owens, Touchzone Production & Publishing). Both works were the recipients of several independent publishing/performance awards. By 2007, Lacy released his second book of poetry Rock & Fire, which garnered him a nomination for "Poet of the Year" – Open Book Awards along with Nikki Giovanni.  He has traveled the nation participating in various spoken word/literary endeavors.

Discography

Albums/EPs
REFlux – Poetic Spirit & Spoken Soul (2004)

Guest and compilation appearances
"A Dead Rose" Rhonda Lawson
"Witness the Truth Volume II" Rashad Rayford
"Point of No Return" Elissa Gabrielle
"Step up to the Mic" Michael J. Burt
"Finger Lickin' Way to Fight Fat" Donna Smith

References

External links
Official Website
Myspace Page
Marc Lacy CD Database

American spoken word artists
Writers from Huntsville, Alabama
Alabama A&M University alumni
21st-century American engineers
1969 births
Living people